Hellinsia subnotatus is a moth of the family Pterophoridae. It is known from Saint Helena.

References

subnotatus
Fauna of Saint Helena
Moths of Africa
Moths described in 1875